Karanga Chhota  is a village in Fatehpur Shekhawati in Sikar district of Rajasthan in India.

References

Villages in Sikar district